The 2002 season was the Denver Broncos' 43rd in professional football and their 33rd in the National Football League. 

With the sudden retirement of Terrell Davis in the preseason, Denver had to rely on rookie Clinton Portis, who provided an instant spark to the Broncos running game. Despite his contribution, however, the Broncos finished with a 9–7 record and narrowly missed the postseason.

Offseason

NFL draft

Undrafted free agents

Staff

Roster

Regular season

Schedule

Standings

References

 Broncos on Pro Football Reference
 Broncos Schedule on jt-sw.com

Denver Broncos
Denver Broncos seasons
Denver Broncos